Alec Russell is an English journalist. He serves as the editor of FT Weekend. He was previously analysis editor and world news editor of the Financial Times. Russell has written three books: Prejudice and Plum Brandy, about his time in the Balkans; Big Men, Little Men, a reflection on his time in South Africa in the mid 90s; and After Mandela, about South Africa under Mbeki. He was nominated for the 2008 Pulitzer Prize and for British foreign correspondent of the year.

Books

References

Living people
English journalists
English non-fiction writers
Financial Times people
Year of birth missing (living people)